The women's 195 + 390 + 585 + 780 metres medley relay event at the 1969 European Indoor Games was held on 8 March in Belgrade. The first athlete ran one lap of the 195-metre track, the second two, the third three and the anchor four, thus 10 laps or 1950 metres in total.

Results

References

4 × 400 metres relay at the European Athletics Indoor Championships
Relay